Chalcoscirtus lepidus is a jumping spider species in the genus Chalcoscirtus that lives in Turkmenistan. It was first described by Wanda Wesołowska in 1996.

References

Salticidae
Spiders of Central Asia
Spiders described in 1996
Taxa named by Wanda Wesołowska